The 2012 Historic Formula One Championship was the 18th season of the Historic Formula One Championship. It began at Donington Park on April 14.

It was won by Joaquin Folch driving a Williams FW08.

Calendar

References

Historic Formula One Championship
Historic Formula